14, rue de Galais (English: 14 Galais Road) is a Canadian television series which ran from 1954 until 1957. Guggenheim Fellow and Montyon Prize winner André Giroux was credited with being a writer for the series.

The series is about the Delisles, a middle class Montreal family.

External links

14, rue de Galais at the Canadian Communications Foundation

1954 Canadian television series debuts
1957 Canadian television series endings
1950s Canadian drama television series
Television shows set in Montreal
Ici Radio-Canada Télé original programming
Black-and-white Canadian television shows